The Family Channel or Family Channel may refer to:

 The Family Channel (American TV network, founded 1990), later Fox Family Channel, then ABC Family, and now Freeform
 The Family Channel (American TV network, founded 2008), formerly My Family TV
 The Family Channel (British TV channel), a British game show television channel now known as Challenge
 Family Channel (Canadian TV channel), a Canadian premium children television channel